The Women's sprint at the European Track Championships was first competed in 2010 in Poland.

The Sprint consists of a qualifying, followed by a knockout system until the final.

Medalists

References

 2010 Results
 2011 Results
 2012 Results

 
Women's sprint
Women's sprint (track cycling)